Jan Chryzostom Pieniążek (c. 1630–1712) was a Polish szlachcic.

Starost of Oświęcim since 1666 and voivode of Sieradz Voivodeship since 1683.

Marshal of the Sejm (zwyczajnego) August 17 - May 4, 1666 in Warsaw.

Bibliography
 Marszałkowie Sejmów I Rzeczypospolitej, s. 72, Wydawnictwo Sejmowe, Warszawa 1993, 

1712 deaths
17th-century Polish nobility
1630 births
Clan of Odrowąż
Secular senators of the Polish–Lithuanian Commonwealth
18th-century Polish nobility